The Stomach is a British short horror film that was written and directed by Ben Steiner. The film had its world premiere on 21 September 2014 at Fantastic Fest, where it won "Best Horror Short". A full-length version of The Stomach is currently in planning.

Synopsis
Frank (Simon Meacock) is a spirit medium whose talents have proven to be more of a curse than a gift. Whenever a spirit is present his stomach will swell and pulsate, a process that enables his customers to talk to their dead loved ones but at the cost of his own physical well being. Tired of the constant pain and suffering, Frank decides that he will give up the medium life but finds that one of his customers is unwilling to accept his new decision to change his career.

Cast
Ben Bishop as Tom
Kiki Kendrick as Gloria
Jennie Lathan as Mrs. Bird
Peter Marinker as Mr. Pope
Simon Meacock as Frank
Neil Newbon as Charlie
Ava Lovell as Monika's daughter
Emily Behr as Monika

Reception
Dread Central praised The Stomach, writing "A mixture of genres packed into 15 minutes, The Stomach is a triumphant mash of cockney gangster-ism, ghost story and Cronenberg-esque body horror." Twitch Film also enjoyed the short, marking Steiner as "a filmmaker to watch".

Awards
Best Horror Short at Fantastic Fest (2014, won)
Short Film Melies d’Argent at Abertoir (2014, won)
Best Short at Celluloid Screams (2014, won)
Best Special Effects/ Make Up at Turin Horror Film Festival (2014, won)

References

External links
 

British horror short films
2014 short films
2014 films
2014 horror films
2010s English-language films